The Amelia Earhart Dam is an earth-fill dam spanning the Mystic River near its mouth between Somerville and Everett, Massachusetts. It was built in 1966  to regulate tidal effects and the incursion of salt water in the upstream river basin.  It has 3 locks for marine traffic. The largest is 325 feet long, and 45 feet wide; the two smaller locks are 120 feet long and, 22 feet wide. There is no public access to the dam.

The dam is named after the aviation pioneer Amelia Earhart whose plane disappeared in 1937.  Earhart lived in nearby Medford, Massachusetts in the 1920s.

The City of Somerville's 2017 Climate Change Vulnerability Assessment noted that by 2035, a 100-year flood would flank the dam, and by 2070, overtop it, leading to major impacts on low-lying areas such as Assembly Square. In 2018, 21 cities and towns near the Mystic River requested flood prevention and mitigation funding, including approximately $20 million for an additional pump.

References

External links

Tide predictions for the Amelia Earhart Dam

Dams in Massachusetts
Mystic River
Earth-filled dams
Dams completed in 1966
Locks of the United States
Monuments and memorials to Amelia Earhart
Somerville, Massachusetts
Everett, Massachusetts
Transportation buildings and structures in Middlesex County, Massachusetts
Transportation buildings and structures in Massachusetts